The year 1889 in architecture involved some significant events.

Events
 August 10 – At the Vienna Hofburg, the grand opening ceremony is held for the Imperial Natural History Museum, begun in 1871; from August 13 to the end of December, the museum counts 175,000 visitors.

Buildings and structures

Buildings

 March 31 – Eiffel Tower in Paris, designed by Gustave Eiffel, is inaugurated. At 300 m, its height exceeds the previous tallest structure in the world by 130 m.
April 27 – The Ilha Fiscal Customs House is inaugurated.
 May 6–October 31 – Exposition Universelle in Paris, with the Eiffel Tower as its entrance arch. The Galerie des machines, designed by architect Ferdinand Dutert and engineer Victor Contamin, at 111 m, spans the longest interior space in the world at this time.
 June 30 — Cathedral of Saints Peter and Paul in Providence, Rhode Island, designed by Patrick Keely, is consecrated.
 July 12 – Cathedral of the Blessed Sacrament (Sacramento, California), designed by Bryan J. Klinch, is completed.
 October 15 – Amsterdam Centraal railway station in the Netherlands, designed by Pierre Cuypers with roof engineered by L. J. Eijmer, is opened.
 December 9 – Auditorium Building in Chicago, designed by Louis Sullivan and Dankmar Adler, is opened.
Custom House designed by Charles McLay in Brisbane, Australia is completed.
 Georgia State Capitol in Atlanta, designed by Edbrooke and Burnham, is completed.
 First Presbyterian Church (Detroit, Michigan), designed by George D. Mason and Zachariah Rice, is built.
 St. Lawrence Anglican Cathedral Ambohimanoro on Madagascar, designed by William White, is completed.
 Mole Antonelliana in Turin, Italy, designed by Alessandro Antonelli, is completed.
 Palau Güell in Barcelona, designed by Antoni Gaudí, is completed.
 Science Hall in University of Minnesota Old Campus Historic District, Minneapolis, designed by Leroy Buffington and his assistant Harvey Ellis, is built.
 Germania Bank Building in Saint Paul, Minnesota, designed by J. Walter Stevens assisted by Harvey Ellis, is built.
 Corbin Building in New York City, designed by Francis H. Kimball, is completed.

Awards
 RIBA Royal Gold Medal – Charles Thomas Newton.

Births
 May 10 – Mihran Mesrobian, Armenian-born American (died 1975)
 May 21 – R. Harold Zook, American architect (died 1949)
 June 24 – Charles Cowles-Voysey, English architect (died 1981)
 August 26 – Jan Buijs, Dutch architect (died 1961)
 October 25 – Sven Markelius, Swedish architect (died 1972)
 December 23 – Joseph Emberton, English modernist architect (died 1956)

Deaths
 May 31 – Charles Lanyon, English architect working in Northern Ireland (born 1813)

References

Buildings and structures completed in 1889
Years in architecture
19th-century architecture